was a town located in Kashima District, Ishikawa Prefecture, Japan.

As of 2003, the town had an estimated population of 4,868 and a density of 329.36 persons per km². The total area was 14.78 km².

On March 1, 2005, Rokusei, along with towns of Kashima and Toriya (all from Kashima District), was merged to create the town of Nakanoto.

External links
 Official website of Nakanoto in Japanese

Dissolved municipalities of Ishikawa Prefecture
Nakanoto, Ishikawa